Green Alternative–Ecologist Movement of Catalonia (AV–MEC) was an ecologist, catalan nationalist political party in Spain, based in Catalonia. It was founded in 1983 from members of Ecologist Movement of Catalonia and Left Nationalists.

References

Green political parties
Political parties in Catalonia
Political parties established in 1983